Veps, also known as Vepsian (Veps:  or ), is a Finnic language from the Uralic language family, that is spoken by Vepsians. The language is written in the Latin script, and is closely related to Finnish and Karelian.

According to Soviet statistics, 12,500 people were self-designated ethnic Veps at the end of 1989. There were 5,900 self-designated ethnic Veps in 2010, and around 3,600 native speakers.

According to the location of the people, the language is divided into three main dialects: Northern Veps (at Lake Onega to the south of Petrozavodsk, to the north of the river Svir, including the former Veps National Volost), Central Veps (in the East of the  Leningrad Oblast and Northwest of the Vologda Oblast), and Southern Veps (in the Leningrad Oblast). The Northern dialect seems the most distinct of the three; however, it is still mutually intelligible for speakers of the other two dialects.

In Russia, more than 350 children learn the Veps language in a total of five national schools.

Veps retains many archaic features, for instance it has no consonant gradation and as a result is very rule-based.

Classification and history

Veps is the easternmost surviving member of the Finnic languages. Having developed in relative isolation, the language lacks several features found in its relatives, such as consonant gradation and the length contrast in consonants. Original vowel length has mostly been lost as well (with the exception of Northern Veps, which retains ii and uu). At the same time, it retains a number of archaic features.

The closest relative of Veps is Ludic, connecting Veps to the wider Finnic dialect continuum.

Veps also shows some characteristic innovations such as the vocalization of original syllable-final*l, and the expansion of the local case system.

Distribution

According to Ethnologue there were 3,160 speakers of Veps in 2010, located in the Republic of Karelia and in the Leningrad and Vologda Oblasts.

Dialects
Veps shows substantial dialectal variation, affecting both phonetics and grammatical features. Three main dialect areas can be distinguished, the northern, central and southern dialects.

Northern
Northern Veps is spoken in the Republic of Karelia along the coast of Lake Onega south of Petrozavodsk. It is also spoken in a few small villages in Leningrad Oblast. Villages speaking Northern Veps include Shyoltozero, Rybreka, and Kvartsitny, as well as the city of Petrozavodsk itself.

Characteristics of Northern Veps are:
 Diphthongs are either preserved in their historical form (koume), or the first component is raised (jaug [jɑʊ̯g] > dʹoug).
 Combinations of vowel + l are usually preserved (talʹv [tɑlʲv], velg, sild, silʹm [silʲm], olda, sülʹg''' [sylʲgʲ], pölvaz [ˡpølvaz]), rarely vocalized to diphthongs: al > au, el, il, ül [yl], öl [øl]> üu [yw] and ol > uu [uː].
 l, n, r are always palatalized before e in a non-initial syllable.
 Word-final consonants are not palatalized after i, in for example the past indicative, the conditional and some case forms.
 Long close vowels are retained, with *üü [yː] often diphthongized to üu (*püü > püu, contrast Southern and Central Veps pü).
 j is fortified to dʹ [dʲ] word-initially, and medially after consonants (jaug > dʹoug [dʲoʊ̯gː], jogi > dʹogi [dʲogi], järv > dʹärv dʲærv], agj > agdʹ).
 The last consonant of the stem is lengthened in the third-person singular present indicative (küzub > küzzub, tapab > tappab), and stem-final e becomes o (lugeb > luggob).
 Only traces of vowel harmony are retained.

Central
Central Veps dialects are rather distinct from each other compared to Northern and Southern Veps, which are relatively homogeneous. They are spoken around a long line stretching from Tervenichey in the Lodeinopolsky District of Leningrad Oblast to near Lake Beloye. The largest locality speaking Central Veps dialects is Vinnitsy.

Characteristics of Central Veps are:
 Diphthongs are usually modified (sain > seinʹ, söi > süi).
 Combinations of vowel + l are vocalized to diphthongs in Kuya and Pondala (Belozersk), and usually preserved elsewhere (edel, silʹm, sülʹkta, völ).
 al and el are vocalized to ou or uu (el may also become üu) in the adessive and ablative case forms (talvel > touvuu or touvüu, mägelpäi > mäguupei).
 Word-final consonants are palatalized after i (mänid > mänidʹ, mänižin > mänižinʹ).
 In Kuya village, the vowel in the allative ending depends on the preceding stem vowel. After i the ending is -le (kanoile), after a it is -la (kalala) and after other vowels it is -lo (lebulo).
 j is preserved in most dialects, mostly in the west (jono, agj). j is fortified to dʹ in Kuya (dʹono, agdʹ). It is fortified to gʹ in Pondala, Voylahta, Nemzha, and Shimozero (gʹono, aggʹ).
 Final obstruent devoicing in Kuya Veps (sanub > sanup, vellesed > velleset).
 Unrounding of ü and ö in a few villages (pühä > pihä, pökoi > pekoi).
 ä > e in Shimozero (päiv > pei(v)).
 Vowel harmony is weakly preserved, most prominently in the eastern and south-western areas.

Southern

Characteristics of Southern Veps are:
 Diphthongs are monophthongized to long vowels, especially in non-initial syllables (pertišpäi > pertišpää, heboine > heboone).
 Combinations of vowel + l are usually preserved.
 al and el are vocalized to aa and oo in the adessive and ablative case forms (talʹvel > talʹvoo, kezal > kezaa).
 l and n are palatalized before e in non-initial syllables when followed by a case ending or person-and-number ending. r is not palatalized.
 Word-final consonants are palatalized after i, in for example the past indicative, the conditional and some case forms.
 j is preserved (jogi, jüged).
 Unrounding of front rounded vowels, ü > i (pühä > pihä) and ö > e.
 The ending -i of the third-person singular past indicative is usually dropped, leaving palatalization of the preceding consonant (pästi > pästʹ, väti > vätʹ, kolkati > kolkatʹ).
 Vowel harmony is preserved well (höblötädä, pörüdä, södä).

Phonology

Consonants

Palatalization
In general, palatalizable consonants are palatalized allophonically before a front vowel. However, palatalized consonants also occur in other environments, especially in word-final position or in word-final clusters.

There are some cases where the front vowel  is preceded by a non-palatalized consonant. Either analysis is possible.

Compare:
 norʹ  ("young"), genitive singular noren , partitive plural norid 
 nor  ("rope"), genitive singular noran , partitive plural norid  (or )

The phoneme  can also in some cases be preceded by non-palatalized consonants, for example in the allative ending -le.

Vowels

See above under "Palatalization" for more information. It does not occur in the first syllable of a word.

Vowel harmony

Like many other Finnic languages, Veps has vowel harmony but in a much more limited form. Words are split into back-vowel and front-vowel words based on which vowels they contain:

 Back vowels: ,  and 
 Front vowels: ,  and 

However, the front vowels can only occur in the first two syllables of a word. In a third or later syllable, and also sometimes in the second syllable, they are converted to the corresponding back vowel. Thus, vowel harmony only applies (inconsistently) in the second syllable, and has been lost elsewhere. It is not applied for inflectional endings except in a few exceptional cases, but is retained more frequently in derivational endings.

For example:
 korged ("high", back-vowel harmony), genitive singular korktan, derived noun korktuz' ("height"); compare Finnish korkean, korkeus.
 pimed ("dark", back-vowel harmony), genitive singular pimedan, derived noun pimeduz' ("darkness"); compare Finnish pimeän, pimeys.
 hüvä ("good", front-vowel harmony), illative singular hüväha, derived noun hüvüz' ("goodness"); compare Finnish hyvään, hyvyys.
 päiv ("day", front-vowel harmony), genitive singular päivän, illative singular päivhan; compare Finnish päivän, päivään.
 pä ("head", back-vowel harmony), illative singular päha; compare Finnish päähän.
 keza ("summer", back-vowel harmony); compare Finnish kesä.
 vävu ("son-in-law", back-vowel harmony); compare Finnish vävy.
 üldüda ("to rise", front-vowel harmony in second syllable, back-vowel in third); compare Finnish yltyä.
 küzuda ("to ask", back-vowel harmony); compare Finnish kysyä.

Orthography
The modern Vepsian alphabet is a Latin alphabet. It consists of a total of twenty-nine characters: twenty-two are from the basic modern Latin alphabet, six are derived from basic Latin letters by the addition of diacritical marks, and the final character is the apostrophe, which signifies palatalization of the preceding sound.

Veps orthography is largely phonemic, and represents each phoneme with one letter. Palatalized consonants are single phonemes, and thus the combination of a letter and a following apostrophe is a single combined letter for this purpose. The following table shows the correspondences between letters and phonemes:

Palatalization of consonants before front vowels is not indicated in the orthography, so plain consonant letters can represent both types of consonant depending on what vowel follows.

Grammar

Like other Finnic languages, Veps is an agglutinating language. The preservation of the Proto-Finnic weak-grade consonants *d and *g in all positions, along with the loss of consonant gradation, has made Veps morphology relatively simple compared to the other Finnic languages. There are fewer inflectional classes, and inflections of nominals and verbs alike can be predicted from only a few basic principal parts.

Nouns
Veps has twenty-three grammatical cases, more than any other Finnic language. It preserves the basic set of Finnic cases shared by most Finnic languages, including the six locative cases, but several more cases have been added that generally have no counterpart in the others.

Notes:
 "V" indicates a copy of whatever vowel the genitive singular stem ends with, replacing a i, ä, ö, ü with e, a, o, u. For example, for the illative singular: mecan > mecha, noren > norehe, pöudon > pöudho, pän > päha. Note that the stem-final vowel itself can disappear in these forms, but the rule applies the same.
 In endings beginning with s or z or a group of consonants containing s or z, this changes to š/ž if the last preceding vowel is i. This always occurs in the plural forms.
 The partitive, allative, terminative II, additive II and prolative singular cases have longer endings that are used with a few frequently-used pronouns, ken "who" and mi "what".

Principal parts

Nouns have four principal parts, from which all other noun forms can be derived by replacing the endings:
 Nominative singular: Forms no other forms.
 Partitive singular: Forms the prolative singular. Can usually be formed from the genitive singular by replacing -n with -d, but some words have an unpredictable form with -t and a different stem.
 Genitive singular: When -n is removed, forms all remaining singular forms, and the nominative and accusative plural.
 Illative singular: Forms the illative, terminative I and additive I singular. The illative singular is predictably formed from the genitive singular stem, so it's not a principal part as such.
 Partitive plural: When -d is removed, forms all remaining plural forms.

The illative singular stem is the same as the genitive singular stem, except that the final vowel is dropped in some cases. The vowel is retained if at least one of these is the case, and dropped otherwise:
 The final vowel is a diphthong.
 The nominative singular is of the form "consonant-vowel-consonant-vowel".
 The genitive singular has 1 or 3 syllables.
 There is contraction of a syllable in the genitive singular stem (compared to the nominative stem), e.g. nom sg vauged > gen sg vauktan (contraction -ged > -kt-), nom sg lambaz > gen sg lambhan (contraction -az > -h-).
 The final consonants of genitive singular stem are ll or lʹlʹ.

Thus:

If the genitive singular stem has h before the final vowel, then the ending -ze (-že after i) is used, and the vowel is never dropped:

Adjectives

Verbs

Endings

Veps has innovated a special reflexive conjugation, which may have middle voice or passive voice semantics. The endings are as follows:

Infinitives:
 First infinitive in -da or -ta (reflexive: add -s).
 Second infinitive in -de- or -te- with inessive or instructive case endings.
 Third infinitive in -ma- with inessive, illative, elative, adessive or abessive case endings.

Participles:
 Present active participle in -i (stem -ja-). This is the same suffix as is used for agent nouns.
 Past active participle in -nu (stem -nude-).
 Past passive participle in -dud or -tud.

The original Finnic present active participle is falling out of use, and is preserved only for a few verbs, as -b (stem -ba-'').

Negative verb

Pronouns
The personal pronouns are of Finno-Ugric origin:

Numbers

Language example

Article 1 of the Universal Declaration of Human Rights:

(English version: All human beings are born free and equal in dignity and rights. They are endowed with reason and conscience and should act towards one another in a spirit of brotherhood).

See also
 Lonin Museum of Veps Ethnography

References

Further reading

External links

 Open corpus of Veps and Karelian languages
 The Peoples of the Red Book: THE VEPS
 St.Petersburg Veps society forum
 Veps language corpus and dictionary (in Russian)
 Vepsian textbooks from 1930s
 Translated texts in Veps

 
Finnic languages
Languages of Russia
Republic of Karelia